Trios Live is a live album by American jazz saxophonist Joshua Redman. The album was released on June 17, 2014 via Nonesuch label.

Reception
Jeff Simon of The Guardian wrote, "The spirit in these live performances – often punctuated vocally by the audience and members of the group – is steadfast and superb."

Track listing

References

External links
 

Joshua Redman albums
2014 live albums
Post-bop albums
Nonesuch Records albums